Psammodromus blanci, also known commonly as Blanc's sand racer or Blanc's psammodromus, is a species of lizard in the family Lacertidae. The species is endemic to North Africa.

Etymology
It has been claimed that the specific name, blanci, and the common name, Blanc's sand racer, are in honor of Swiss zoologist Henri Blanc however it is in fact named after its Algerian discoverer Marius Blanc.

Geographic range
P. blanci is found in Algeria, Morocco, and Tunisia.

Habitat

Reproduction
P. blanci is oviparous. A sexually mature female may lay four or five clutches a year. Each clutch contains two to five eggs.

Conservation status
P. blanci is threatened by habitat loss.

References

Further reading
Bischoff W, in den Bosch HAJ (1991). "Zur Kenntnis von Psammodromus blanci (Lataste, 1880): Morphologie, Verbreitung, Ökologie und Paarunsbiologie". Salamandra 27 (3): 163–180. (in German, with an abstract in English).
Boulenger GA (1887). Catalogue of the Lizards in the British Museum (Natural History). Second Edition. Volume III. Lacertidæ, ... London: Trustees of the British Museum (Natural History). (Taylor and Francis, printers). xii + 575 pp. + Plates I-XL. (Psammodromus blanci, pp. 48–49).
Lataste F (1880). "Diagnoses de reptiles nouveaux d'Algérie". Le Naturaliste 1: 299, 306–307, 325. (Zerzoumia blanci, new species, p. 299). (in French).

Psammodromus
Reptiles described in 1880
Taxa named by Fernand Lataste
Taxonomy articles created by Polbot